Zalakeh or Zalkeh or Zalekeh, also known as Dalakeh, may refer to:
 Zalakeh-ye Farajollah-e Montazeri
 Zalakeh-ye Hajj Abbas Qoli
 Zalakeh-ye Vaziri